Aze was the Garad (chief) of the Hadiya seven houses which consisted of Siltʼe, Wolane, Ulbarag, Azernet, Barbare, Wuriro, and Gadabano, speakers of Semitic Harari language. He was defacto ruler of the Hadiya state. During the reign of Emperor Sarsa Dengel of Ethiopia, Aze initiated a revolt after killing the Abyssinian administrator Rom Sagad in Hadiya which led to his defeat at the Battle of Hadiya in 1569.

References

16th-century Ethiopian people
People from Harari Region